The city of Iași, Romania is home to a large number of historic churches and monasteries. Unless otherwise noted, these belong to the Romanian Orthodox Church.

Metropolitan Cathedral
Old Metropolitan Cathedral
Bucium Monastery
Cetățuia Monastery
Frumoasa Monastery
Galata Monastery
Golia Monastery
Podgoria Copou Monastery
Socola Monastery
Trei Ierarhi Monastery
Annunciation Church
Banu Church
Barnovschi Church
Bărboi Church
Curelari Church
Entry of the Theotokos into the Temple Church
Holy Forty Martyrs Church
Holy Trinity Church
Mitocul Maicilor
Nicoriță Church
Ss. Athanasius and Cyrill Church
Saint Charalambos Church
Saint Demetrius-Balș Church
Saint George-Lozonschi Church
Saint John the Baptist Church
Saint Lazarus Church
Saint Nicholas-Ciurchi Church
Saint Nicholas Princely Church
Saint Parascheva Church
Saint Sabbas Church
Saint Spyridon Church
Ss. Theodore Church
Socola Mică Church
Talpalari Church
Three Holy Hierarchs Chapel
Toma Cozma Church
Vulpe Church
White Church
Zlataust Church
Apostolic Church (New Apostolic)
Armenian Church (Armenian Apostolic)
Lipovan Church (Lipovan)
Assumption of Mary Church (Roman Catholic)
Our Lady Queen of Iași Cathedral (Roman Catholic)

Culture in Iași
Iasi, list of churches
 
Iasi